Basibulbus is a genus of Chilean araneomorph spiders in the family Orsolobidae, and was first described by R. Ott in 2013.<ref name=Ott2013>{{cite journal| last=Ott| first=R.| display-authors=etal| year=2013| title=Basibulbus, a hard-bodied, haplogyne spider genus from Chile (Araneae, Dysderoidea)| journal=American Museum Novitates| pages=1–20| issue=3775| doi=10.1206/3775.2| s2cid=83729582| url=https://zenodo.org/record/5363905}}</ref>  it contains only three species, found only in Chile: B. concepcion, B. granizo, and B. malleco''.

See also
 List of Orsolobidae species

References

Araneomorphae genera
Orsolobidae
Spiders of South America
Endemic fauna of Chile